Adrienne Galanek is an American diplomat.  She has served as Deputy Chief of Mission at the United States Embassy in Guyana since July 2, 2022.

Galanek succeeded Ambassador Carlos R. Moreno in January 2017 as the Chargé d'Affaires at the United States Embassy in Belize. She stayed until July 2018 when she was replaced by Keith Gilges.

References

American women ambassadors
Ambassadors of the United States
Ambassadors of the United States to Belize
Year of birth missing (living people)
Living people
21st-century American women